Annett Davis (born September 22, 1973) is an American beach volleyball player, who won the silver medal at the 1999 Beach Volleyball World Championships, alongside Jenny Johnson Jordan.

Career
Throughout her career, she has partnered with Jenny Johnson Jordan.

In 1999, she and Johnson Jordan were the winningest USA men's or women's pro beach volleyball team with over $200,000 in winnings.

Davis was named "Queen of the beach" in the Honolulu AVP tournament.

Davis and Johnson Jordan missed the 2005 AVP tour because of their pregnancies.

http://www.bvbinfo.com/player.asp?ID=1198

Personal life
Davis currently resides in Valencia, California with husband Byron and two children, Mya (born 2001) and Victoria (born 2005).

References

External links
 
 
 
 
 

1973 births
Living people
American women's beach volleyball players
Beach volleyball players at the 2000 Summer Olympics
Olympic beach volleyball players of the United States
People from Valencia, Santa Clarita, California
21st-century American women
UCLA Bruins women's volleyball players